Marius Mouandilmadji (born 22 January 1997), sometimes known as just Marius, is a Chadian professional footballer who plays as a forward for Belgian Pro League club Seraing and the Chad national team.

Club career

Porto
On 17 July 2018, Mouandilmadji signed a four-year contract with Porto. Despite initial media reports stating that the youngster would play for the reserve side, manager Sérgio Conceição integrated him with the pre-season main squad.

Mouandilmadji made his professional debut for the Primeira Liga title holders on 11 August as an 81st-minute substitute for fellow Coton Sport FC de Garoua graduate Vincent Aboubakar, and scored the final goal of a 5–0 home win over Chaves. He then dropped down to the second team in LigaPro, and scored both of their goals of a 2–1 win over C.D. Cova da Piedade on 11 November.

On 9 January 2020, Mouandilmadji was loaned to last-placed Aves for the rest of the top-flight season. After their relegation, he was named in Porto's first-team squad for 2020–21. He rescinded his contract by mutual consent in January 2021, with 18 months remaining.

Seraing
After being a free agent for six months, Mouandilmadji signed a two-year contract with Belgian Pro League club Seraing in July 2021.

International career
In August 2019, Mouandilmadji was called up for the first time to the Chad national team, for a 2022 FIFA World Cup qualifier against neighbours Sudan. He started the match, a 3–1 home loss on 5 September.

Honours

Club
Coton Sport
 Cameroon Premiere Division: 2018

Individual
 LFPC Youngster of the Month: March 2018
 LFPC Player of the Month: April 2018

References

External links
 
 
 

1998 births
Living people
People from Logone Oriental Region
Chadian footballers
Chad international footballers
Gazelle FC players
Coton Sport FC de Garoua players
FC Porto players
FC Porto B players
C.D. Aves players
R.F.C. Seraing (1922) players
Association football forwards
Elite One players
Primeira Liga players
Liga Portugal 2 players
Belgian Pro League players
Chadian expatriate footballers
Expatriate footballers in Cameroon
Chadian expatriate sportspeople in Cameroon
Expatriate footballers in Portugal
Chadian expatriate sportspeople in Portugal
Expatriate footballers in Belgium
Chadian expatriate sportspeople in Belgium